The Fighting Ranger is a 1934 American pre-Code Western film directed by George B. Seitz.

Cast
 Buck Jones as Jim Houston (as Charles 'Buck' Jones)
 Dorothy Revier as Tonita, Cantina Singer
 Frank Rice as Thunder, Texas Ranger
 Bradley Page as Cougar the Half Breed
 Ward Bond as Dave, Cougar Henchman
 Frank LaRue as Ranger Captain Wilkes (as Frank La Rue)
 Paddy O'Flynn as Bob Houston
 Mozelle Britton as Waitress in Eureka (as Mozelle Brittonne)

References

External links

1934 films
American Western (genre) films
1934 Western (genre) films
Films directed by George B. Seitz
American black-and-white films
Columbia Pictures films
1930s American films